Mohamed Sohel Rana (Bengali: মোহাম্মদ সোহেল রানা) (born 13 December 1991)  is a Bangladeshi footballer who plays as a midfielder. He currently plays for Sheikh Russel KC in the Bangladesh Premier League. He also plays for the Bangladesh national team.

Club career
On 24 November 2016, Sohel's free kick goal from 30 yards, earned financially struggling Muktijoddha Sangsad KC a crucial win against his former club Mohammedan SC, during the 2016 Bangladesh Premier League.

On 23 February 2022, Sohel scored the only goal during the Dhaka Derby. He dedicated his long range strike to his late wife and son, who were both killed in a street accident, in 2018.

International career
Sohel was called up to the Bangladesh national football team for the 2022 FIFA World Cup qualifiers by head coach at the time Jamie Day. However, he was not able to make a single appearance during the qualifiers.

Personal life
On 24 November 2018, while Sohel was returning to Dhaka from his   house in Manikganj with his family, to join Sheikh Russel KC for the upcoming  2017–18  Independence Cup, an accident took place as a speeding truck crashed into his motorcycle. This killed Sohel’s wife Arfin Akter Jhuma, and four year old son Abdullah on the spot, while Rana himself sustained serious injuries.

References 

Abahani Limited (Dhaka) players
Mohammedan SC (Dhaka) players
Brothers Union players
Muktijoddha Sangsad KC players
Sheikh Russel KC players
Feni SC players
Abahani Limited (Chittagong) players
Saif SC players
Living people
1991 births
Bangladeshi footballers
Bangladesh international footballers
Association football midfielders